First Band on the Moon is the third studio album by the Cardigans. It features the international single "Lovefool".
It was first released on 12 August 1996 and internationally on 6 September 1996.

The album was a major breakthrough for the band, both in their native Sweden and internationally. It is their best-selling album in the United States, having sold around 664,000 copies there as of September 2010.

Track listing

"Happy Meal II" is a re-recording of "Happy Meal", a song that was originally a bonus track on the US edition of Life, with some minor lyric changes.

Black Sabbath connections

At least two songs on the album directly reference Black Sabbath material.  In addition to the cover "Iron Man", "Heartbreaker" begins and ends with a quotation of the primary material from the song "Black Sabbath", the first track on Black Sabbath's debut album.

Personnel
Lars-Olof Johansson – keyboards, piano
Bengt Lagerberg – drums, percussion
Nina Persson – lead vocals
Magnus Sveningsson – bass, vocals
Peter Svensson – guitar, vocals

Singles
 "Lovefool" (9 September 1996, #21 UK)
 "Been It" (25 November 1996, #56 UK)
 "Lovefool" (re-release 24 February 1997, #2 UK)
 "Your New Cuckoo" (25 August 1997, #35 UK)

Release dates refer to UK single releases. In Europe and Japan, "Your New Cuckoo" was released much earlier than in the UK, where the release was delayed due to the continued success of "Lovefool" and also to commission new remixes for the single release.

"Been It" and "Your New Cuckoo" were both slightly shortened for single release; the former also had the word "whore" obscured by a guitar lick to make it more palatable for radio play.

Charts

Weekly charts

Year-end charts

Single charts
United States
Billboard Hot 100 Airplay: "Lovefool"; #1
Billboard Adult Top 40: "Lovefool"; #2
Billboard Modern Rock Tracks: "Lovefool"; #9
Billboard Top 40 Mainstream: "Lovefool"; #1
Billboard Adult Contemporary: "Lovefool"; #23
Billboard Hot Dance Music/Club Play: "Lovefool"; #5
Billboard Hot Dance Music/Maxisingle Sales: "Lovefool; #24
Billboard Rhythmic Top 40: "Lovefool"; #18
Billboard Top 40 Adult Recurrents: "Lovefool" #1
UK
UK Radio Airplay: "Lovefool"; #1
UK Top 100 Singles: "Lovefool"; #21, "Been It"; #56, "Lovefool" (Re-issue); #2, "Your New Cuckoo"; #35
Australia
ARIA Top 100 Singles 1997 Year-End Chart: "Lovefool"; #52
Sweden
Swedish Top 100 Singles 1996 Year-end Chart: "Lovefool"; #60

Certifications

References

External links
 First Band on the Moon microsite
 The Cardigans' discography on Rolling Stone website
 IFPI Sweden
Polyhex UK chart information

1996 albums
Mercury Records albums
The Cardigans albums
Albums produced by Tore Johansson
Stockholm Records albums